Ebersbach is a town in the district of Göppingen in Baden-Württemberg, in southern Germany.

History
Ebersbach an der Fils was first mentioned in 1170. In 1299, it became a possession of the County of Württemberg, which already owned property nearby. Throughout the Middle Ages, Ebersbach was under the jurisdiction of the city of Göppingen. Ebersbach developed considerably after World War II, first spreading to the west of the city. The city expanded eastward, northeastward, and then westward in the 1980s. Ebersbach grew politically in the 1970s with the incorporation of the municipalities of Roßwälden in 1972 and Bünzwangen and Weiler ob der Fils in 1975.

Bünzwangen
Bünzwangen became a possession of the Duchy of Württemberg in 1568 and from then on was assigned to the district of Göppingen.

Roßwälden
During the Protestant Reformation, Roßwälden became increasingly dependent upon Württemberg as it controlled more and more property nearby until it was annexed by the Duchy. Roßwälden was assigned to the district of Kirchheim unter Teck until 1938, when it was reassigned to the district of Göppingen.

Weiler ob der Fils
Weiler was a borough of Roßwälden until 1905 and was thus assigned to  until 1938, when it too was assigned to Göppingen's district.

Geography
The city (Stat) of Ebersbach an der Fils lies on the western edge of the district of Göppingen, along its border with the district of Esslingen am Neckar. The Fils flows through the municipality from east to west. Elevation above sea level in the municipal area ranges from a high of  Normalnull (NN) to a low of  NN.

Politics
Ebersbach an der Fils has four boroughs (Ortsteile): Ebersbach an der Fils, Bünzwangen, Roßwälden, and Weiler ob der Fils. There are also six villages within the municipal area: Birkenhöfe, Büchenbronn, Erlenhof, Krapfenreut, Lindenhof, and Sulpach. There is one abandoned village, Stainboß.

Coat of arms
Ebersbach's coat of arms displays a boar in yellow, standing upon green ground and facing left, upon a field of red. The boar has been a motif of Ebersbach since 1489, though its appearance has varied since then. The municipal coat of arms, which shows the boar standing, was derived from an image from 1535; others, such as a keystone in the parish church, show the boar walking or jumping.

Transport
Ebersbach is connected to Germany's network of roadways by Bundesstraße 10 and its railways by the Fils Valley Railway.

References

External links

  (in German)

Towns in Baden-Württemberg
Göppingen (district)